The Sânpetru Formation is an early Maastrichtian geologic formation. Dinosaur remains are among the fossils that have been recovered from the formation. It is located in Romania, near Sânpetru village, part of Sântămăria-Orlea commune. It forms a component of the Hațeg Island fauna.

Description 
The Sânpetru Formation crops out in the central to southern Hațeg Basin along the Bărbat River and comprises sandstones and mudstones deposited in a wet floodplain environment characterized by braided fluvial channels. The formation is correlated with the Densuș-Ciula Formation of the northern section of the same basin, both dating to the Maastrichtian of the Late Cretaceous.

Fossil content

Amphibians

Turtles

Squamates

Crocodyliformes

Ornithischians

Sauropods

Theropods

Pterosaurs

Mammals

See also 
 List of dinosaur-bearing rock formations
 Hateg Island

References

Bibliography 

  
  
 
  

Geologic formations of Romania
Upper Cretaceous Series of Europe
Cretaceous Romania
Maastrichtian Stage
Sandstone formations
Mudstone formations
Fluvial deposits
Ooliferous formations
Fossiliferous stratigraphic units of Europe
Paleontology in Romania